Plakophilin-3 is a protein that in humans is encoded by the PKP3 gene.

Function 

This gene encodes a member of the arm-repeat (armadillo) and plakophilin gene families. Plakophilin proteins contain numerous armadillo repeats, localize to cell desmosomes and nuclei, and participate in linking cadherins to intermediate filaments in the cytoskeleton. This protein may act in cellular desmosome-dependent adhesion and signaling pathways.

Interactions 

PKP3 has been shown to interact with:
 DSC3, 
 DSG1,
 DSG2 and
 DSG3.

References

Further reading 

 
 
 
 
 
 
 
 
 
 
 
 

Armadillo-repeat-containing proteins